Belzutifan, sold under the brand name Welireg, is an anti-cancer medication used for the treatment of von Hippel–Lindau disease-associated renal cell carcinoma. It is taken by mouth. Belzutifan is an hypoxia-inducible factor-2 alpha (HIF-2α) inhibitor.

The most common side effects include decreased hemoglobin, anemia, fatigue, increased creatinine, headache, dizziness, increased glucose, and nausea.

Belzutifan is the first drug to be awarded an "innovation passport" from the UK Medicines and Healthcare products Regulatory Agency (MHRA). Belzutifan was approved for medical use in the United States in August 2021. Belzutifan is the first hypoxia-inducible factor-2 alpha inhibitor therapy approved in the US. The US Food and Drug Administration (FDA) considers it to be a first-in-class medication.

Medical uses 
Belzutifan is indicated for treatment of adults with von Hippel-Lindau (VHL) disease who require therapy for associated renal cell carcinoma (RCC), central nervous system (CNS) hemangioblastomas, or pancreatic neuroendocrine tumors (pNET), not requiring immediate surgery. Belzutifan was also found to be efficacious in an adolescent who had Pacak–Zhuang syndrome with polycythemia and paragangliomas.

History 
The FDA granted the application for belzutifan orphan drug designation.

References

External links 
 
 
 

Breakthrough therapy
Orphan drugs
Benzonitriles
Fluoroarenes
Sulfonates
Indanes
Diphenyl ethers